The Franklin Regional Transit Authority (FRTA) is a regional transit authority which provides public transportation principally to Franklin County and the North Quabbin region, both in Massachusetts.  The FRTA is based in the county seat of Greenfield, Massachusetts.

History
Prior to the FRTA, Greenfield and its surrounding areas were served by the intermunicipal Greenfield and Montague Transportation Area (GMTA), an authority created with the purchase of assets of the defunct Connecticut Valley Street Railway in 1924. The FRTA was established in 1978 with then implementation of Massachusetts General Laws Chapter 161B, which gave rise to several regional transit authorities throughout Massachusetts. FRTA is the largest public transit authority in Massachusetts by territory.

In 1999, the FRTA and the Fitchburg-based Montachusett Regional Transit Authority (MART) cooperated to form a route to Athol and Orange, Massachusetts, linking Greenfield to the MART terminal in Gardner.

Although not in the FRTA service area, public bus service between Greenfield and Northampton began in 2000.

In 2006, the FRTA assumed the responsibility of providing transportation services for the towns of Greenfield and Montague, when the former Greenfield Montague Transportation Area (GMTA) transit authority became unfunded by the state Department of Transportation.

In 2013, Athol voted to withdraw from the FRTA service district, and instead voted to join MART, necessitating that the former Greenfield/Athol route be truncated in Orange.

Routes
FRTA public transportation service is available Monday through Friday. Fares on fixed route buses are free through June 30, 2023. FRTA is classified as a 'rural' transit authority.

Route 20 - GreenLink Connector: This is a mornings-only local route entirely within the Town of Greenfield, with eight trips between 6:15 am and 9:30 am, and a ninth one-way trip originating at the Greenfield Gardens apartment complex at 4:35 am and arriving at the JWO Transit Center at 4:55 am. This route runs as a connector service from the JWO Transit Center to Greenfield Community College, the Greenfield Corporate Center, as well as around town to allow passengers to connect with outbound buses at the JWO Transit Center.

Route 21 - Greenfield Community: This is a local route entirely within the Town of Greenfield. This route departs the JWO Transit Center hourly between 8:00 am and 6:50 pm. This route is the primary in-town transportation option throughout the town of Greenfield, with service to major apartment complexes, shopping plazas, and allows for connections to other routes at the JWO Transit Center.

Route 22 - BlueLink Connector:  This was a local route within the Town of Montague, including the Villages of Turners Falls, Lake Pleasant, and Millers Falls. It was suspended as a casualty of the COVID-19 pandemic, and permanently discontinued on May 23, 2022.

Route 23 - Sunderland/Greenfield: This route serves Greenfield, Turners Falls, Millers Falls, Montague Center, and Sunderland with six round trips daily between the JWO Transit Center in Greenfield and Sugarloaf Estates in Sunderland. At Sugarloaf Estates, passengers may transfer for free between FRTA and Pioneer Valley Transit Authority (PVTA) Route 31 for service to Amherst and UMass.

Route 24 - Crosstown Connector:  This route travels between Avenue A and 11th Street in downtown Turners Falls, and Greenfield Community College, in Greenfield, via the JWO Transit Center. This route runs hourly between 9:15 am and 7:05 pm on weekdays only. Route 24, created with service improvements in September 2017, provides frequent and direct service between Greenfield Community College, Big Y Plaza, downtown Greenfield, the JWO Transit Center, Franklin Medical Center, Stop and Shop Plaza, and downtown Turners Falls. This route is timed to make free transfers with other FRTA bus routes at the JWO Transit Center. Passengers may transfer for free between Route 24 and FRTA Routes 22, 23, 32 at Avenue A and Third Street.

Route 31 - Northampton/Greenfield: This route serves the towns of Greenfield, Deerfield, Whately, Hatfield and Northampton.  There are seven round trips per day, between the JWO Transit Center in downtown Greenfield, and the Academy of Music in downtown Northampton, where passengers may transfer between FRTA and the Pioneer Valley Transit Authority (PVTA) .

Route 32 - Orange/Greenfield: This route serves Greenfield, Turners Falls, Millers Falls, Erving, and Orange.  There are seven round trips a day, and the eastern terminus is at Hannaford's in Athol, just across the Orange town line.

Route 41 - Charlemont/Greenfield:  This route serves Greenfield, Shelburne, Shelburne Falls, Buckland and Charlemont.  There are four round trips a day, and the western terminus is at Avery's Store in Charlemont Center.

John W. Olver Transit Center

The John W. Olver Transit Center houses the FRTA offices and the Franklin Regional Council of Governments, the successor organization to the Franklin County county government. It has provisions for local FRTA buses and Amtrak service, and links with Greyhound Lines for intercity bus service to Springfield, Boston and Brattleboro. All FRTA bus routes service the JWO Transit Center.

References

External links

1978 establishments in Massachusetts
Greenfield, Massachusetts
Bus transportation in Massachusetts
Government agencies established in 1978
Transportation in Franklin County, Massachusetts
Transportation in Hampshire County, Massachusetts
Transportation in Worcester County, Massachusetts